Diocese of Ferentium is a former bishopric (now titular see) with capital in town Ferentium near Viterbo (in Lazio, Central Italy), which absorbed it.

History 
Diocese Ferentium was established around 400 AD. In 700 AD, the diocese was suppressed and its territory annexed to the Diocese of Bomarzo.

Titular see 
In 1970, the old diocese was nominally restored as a Latin titular see.

It has had the following incumbents, of both the lowest (episcopal) and intermediate (archiepiscopal) ranks:
 Titular Archbishop José García y Goldaraz (1970.07.02 – 1970.12.11) 
 Titular Bishop Biagio Vittorio Terrinoni, Capuchin Friars (O.F.M. Cap.) (1971.04.17 – 1977.04.22)
 Titular Bishop Remigio Ragonesi (1977.05.27 – 1991.07.06 see below), an Auxiliary Bishop of the Vicariate of Rome
 Titular Archbishop Remigio Ragonesi (see above 1991.07.06 – 2000.03.22), the Vicegerent for the Vicariate of Rome 
 Titular Archbishop Antonio Mennini, Apostolic Nuncio to the UK (Great Britain) (2000.07.08 – ...)

Source and External links 
 GigaCatholic, with titular incumbent biography links

Catholic titular sees in Europe